Bentree is an unincorporated community in Clay and Nicholas counties, West Virginia, United States.

References

Unincorporated communities in Clay County, West Virginia
Unincorporated communities in Nicholas County, West Virginia
Unincorporated communities in West Virginia
Coal towns in West Virginia